The PC-7 Team is an aerobatics team of the Swiss Air Force. It derives its name from the Pilatus PC-7 trainer, the team's primary aircraft.

History

Soon after the PC-7 was introduced in 1982, the Swiss Air Force started to present the new airplane in solo displays. The first public team display was in 1987, performed by an ad-hoc team of nine volunteer pilots. When the Swiss Air Force celebrated its 75th anniversary in 1989, the PC-7 Team was officially established. Since then, it has been performing in Switzerland several times a year, and since 1992 also occasionally abroad.

Since its establishment the team has flown the Pilatus PC-7 Turbo Trainer. In October 2006, it was replaced by the NCPC-7, which is a PC-7 equipped with a new cockpit. The PC-7 Team currently flies nine Pilatus PC-7 in the standard configuration of the Swiss Air Force's PC-7. The PC-7 Team still uses the unique Swiss Air Force Bambini-Code for its radio communication.

The PC-7 Team's homebase is Dübendorf Air Base, but they often operate from Militärflugplatz Emmen or Locarno Airport. All pilots of the PC-7 Team are full-time military pilots and usually fly the F/A-18. The show program is made from 23 different elements. In 2014 the nine aircraft were fitted with smoke generators, it was publicly used for the first time on 1 August 2014 at Buochs Airport at the roll-out of the Pilatus PC-24. The smoke system was built and financed by the company Pilatus Aircraft. Currently seven smoking systems are available which can be mounted in the luggage compartment of the PC-7. The diesel-oil mixture is injected into the right exhaust of the PC-7.

Award
 Royal International Air Tattoo UK "King Hussein Memorial Sword"

See also
 Patrouille Suisse – the Swiss Air Force's jet aerobatic team
 List of Swiss Air Force display teams

References

 Swiss Air Force Page about the PC-7 Team (in German)
 PC-7 Team homepage
 Book PC-7 TEAM – Backstage SBN: 978-3-906055-07-7

External links

 
 360° panoramic cockpit video (7:41 minutes; HTML5 / Adobe Flash)

Aerobatic teams
Swiss Air Force